Nguyễn Lương Bằng (2 April 1904 – 20 July 1979) was a Vietnamese revolutionary activist and politician. He held the post as Vice President of Vietnam from 1969 to 1979 (North Vietnam until 1976), and General Director of Vietnam National Bank. He was North Vietnam's first ambassador in the Soviet Union from 1953 to 1956 and the Government Inspector General in 1956.

Early life 
Nguyễn Lương Bằng was born on April 2, 1904, in Thanh Miện District in Hải Dương. He was born into a poor family with patriotic traditions. Throughout his life he used the alias Anh Cả, and Sao Đỏ. In December 1925, he was admitted to the Vietnam Revolutionary Youth Association. From there he and some other patriotic youth attended political training classes led by Hồ Chí Minh Hồ Tùng Mậu, Lê Hồng Sơn.  In October 1929, in Hong Kong he was admitted to the Communist Party led by Nguyễn Ái Quốc (Hồ Chí Minh). In May 1931, he was captured secretly detained in Catina Saigon. Shortly afterwards, he was taken down to the Sea of Shipping ship to Haiphong and put into detention at the Hỏa Lò prison in Hanoi. In late 1931, he was sent back to Hải Dương. In June 1932, the court of Hải Dương sentenced him to life imprisonment and transferred to Hỏa Lò prison. In late 1932 he escaped to Vĩnh Yên then to Thanh Miện (Hải Dương) to work.  At the end of 1933, when he went to Bắc Giang, he was arrested and detained in Hỏa Lò (early 1934).  
In May 1935, he was sent to Sơn La prison.  In 1943 the Party arranged for him to escape to Vạn Phúc village to meet Hoàng Văn Thụ to assume the task, he was nominated by the Party as an alternate member of the Party Central Committee, in charge of financial affairs and the military work of the Party; At the same time, he was assigned to work in the Việt Minh as leader of the General Department. After the August Revolution, Nguyễn Lương Bằng held the post  as General Director of the National Bank of Vietnam, the first ambassador of North Vietnam to the Soviet Union (1953-1956), head of the Central Commission for Inspection, government (1956). In September 1969, he was elected Vice President of Vietnam. He died on July 20, 1979 at the age of 75.

References 

Members of the 1st Standing Committee of the Indochinese Communist Party
Alternates of the 1st Central Committee of the Indochinese Communist Party
Members of the 1st Central Committee of the Indochinese Communist Party
Members of the 2nd Central Committee of the Workers' Party of Vietnam
Members of the 3rd Central Committee of the Workers' Party of Vietnam
Members of the 4th Central Committee of the Communist Party of Vietnam
Governors of the State Bank of Vietnam
People from Hải Dương province
1904 births
1979 deaths